Lažany is a municipality and village in Liberec District in the Liberec Region of the Czech Republic. It has about 200 inhabitants.

Geography
It lies in the Jičín Uplands.

History
The first written mention of Lažany is from 1397.

Transport
The D10 motorway runs along the southern municipal border of Lažany and then continues as the I/35 road along the eastern municipal border.

References

External links

Villages in Liberec District